The 2011 Al Hillah bombing was an attack that took place in the city of Hillah on 5 May 2011. A suicide bomber detonated a car full of explosives at a local police station, killing 24 recruits and injuring at least 72 more. A few days after the explosion the Islamic State of Iraq claimed responsibility for it, saying it was revenge for the death of Osama Bin Laden on 2 May 2011. The insurgents apparently scouted the police HQ for some time before attacking during peak hours when more than 200 people were inside the building.

See also

 List of terrorist incidents, 2011

References 

2011 murders in Iraq
Explosions in 2011
21st-century mass murder in Iraq
Mass murder in 2011
2011 in Iraq
Suicide car and truck bombings in Iraq
Terrorist incidents in Iraq in 2011
Islamic terrorist incidents in 2011
Hillah
May 2011 events in Iraq
Attacks on police stations in the 2010s
Building bombings in Iraq